Robert Findlay (1859–1951) was a Scottish-born Canadian architect. He was born in Inverness, Scotland, and moved to Montreal in 1885. He won the competition to expand the first Sun Life Building and was the architect for that project, which he began in 1890. The Sun Life company left that building for the current Sun Life Building in 1913.

Career
Findlay cultivated an extensive practice, working in later years with his son, Frank. He designed several mansions in the Golden Square Mile and a number of other large private houses in Westmount, as well as Westmount City Hall. His private clients included four members of the Molson family, Robert Wilson Reford, F.E. Meredith, Charles Meredith, J.K.L. Ross, Sir Edward Beatty, Charles Francis Smithers, A.A. Bronfman and Sir Mortimer Davis.

Many of the Golden Square Mile homes that he designed were later purchased by McGill University, including the Sir Mortimer Davis House (now Purvis Hall). Findlay designed the Calvary Congregational Church (1911) in Westmount, located at the intersection of Greene Street and Dorchester Boulevard (demolished in 1961). He also designed the base for Montreal's Lion of Belfort monument in Dorchester Square.

Gallery

References

External links

McGill archives profile
Robert Findlay and the Macaulay Family Architecture by Hazel Power (1993 thesis abstract)
Stewart Hall
Westmount Public Library: chronology
Purvis Hall (formerly Sir Mortimer B. Davis House) from Virtual McGill
Martlet House (formerly Hallward House) from Virtual McGill
Historic Places in Canada

1859 births
1951 deaths
Scottish architects
Canadian architects
Scottish emigrants to Canada
People from Inverness
Architects from Montreal
Anglophone Quebec people